Baron Bridges, of Headley in the County of Surrey and of Saint Nicholas at Wade in the County of Kent, is a title in the Peerage of the United Kingdom. It was created on 4 February 1957 for the prominent civil servant Sir Edward Bridges. He was Cabinet Secretary from 1938 to 1946. He was succeeded by his son, the second Baron, in 1969. He notably served as British Ambassador to Italy from 1983 to 1987. Lord Bridges was one of the ninety-two elected hereditary peers that remained in the House of Lords after the passing of the House of Lords Act 1999, before his removal for non-attendance in 2016.  the title is held by his son, the third Baron, who succeeded to the title in that year. He is the solicitor to, among others, Queen Elizabeth II of the United Kingdom and other members of the Royal family.
The first Baron was the son of poet laureate Robert Bridges. The first Baron's grandson and current Baron's cousin was created a Life Peer as Baron Bridges of Headley.

The family seat is Great House, near Orford, Suffolk.

Barons Bridges (1957)
Edward Ettingdene Bridges, 1st Baron Bridges (1892–1969)
Thomas Edward Bridges, 2nd Baron Bridges (1927–2017)
Mark Thomas Bridges, 3rd Baron Bridges (b. 1954)

The heir presumptive is the present holder's younger brother Nicholas Edward Bridges (b. 1956)
The heir presumptive's heir apparent is his son Matthew Orlando Bridges (b. 1988)

Line of Succession

  Edward Ettingdean Bridges, 1st Baron Bridges (1892—1969)
  Thomas Edward Bridges, 2nd Baron Bridges (1927—2017) Elected to remain in the house 1999—2016. The Earl of Cork and Orrery took his room.
  Mark Thomas Bridges, 3rd Baron Bridges (born 1954)
 (1) Nicholas Edward Bridges (b. 1956)
 (2) Matthew Orlando Bridges (b. 1988)
 Robert Oliver Bridges (1930—2015)
 (3) John Edward Bridges (b. 1968)
 (4)  James George Robert Bridges, Baron Bridges of Headley (b. 1970)
 (5) Alfred Edward George Bridges (b. 2008)

References
Kidd, Charles, Williamson, David (editors). Debrett's Peerage and Baronetage (1990 edition). New York: St Martin's Press, 1990.

Specific

Baronies in the Peerage of the United Kingdom
Noble titles created in 1957
People from Orford, Suffolk